Harry Adams was an American college men's basketball coach. He was the head coach of the DePaul University from 1924 to 1925, guiding them to a 6-13 record. After a long lapse from the college ranks, he also served as head coach of Kent State, whom he led to a 28-16 record over two seasons from 1946-1948. He also served as an assistant on Kent State's football team.

References

Year of birth missing
American men's basketball coaches
DePaul Blue Demons men's basketball coaches
Kent State Golden Flashes football coaches
Kent State Golden Flashes men's basketball coaches
Muskingum Fighting Muskies men's basketball coaches